The Filmfare Lifetime Achievement Award, initially named Raj Kapoor Award for Lifetime Achievement after Raj Kapoor is given by the Filmfare magazine as part of its annual Filmfare Awards for Hindi films.

List of honourees
† - Indicates the person also won the Dadasaheb Phalke Award

Superlatives
 In 58th Filmfare Awards, Yash Chopra became the first artist to become a posthumous winner.
 Oldest Winner – Manna Dey in 56th Filmfare Awards (aged 91)
 Youngest Winner – Amitabh Bachchan in 36th Filmfare Awards & Rekha in 48th Filmfare Awards (both aged 48)
 Number of Female recipients – 21
 Number of Male recipients – 26

See also
 Filmfare Awards
 Bollywood
 Cinema of India
 Filmi music

External links
Filmfare Lifetime Achievement Awards

 01
Lifetime Achievement
Lifetime achievement awards